Sesame seed cake is a cake made of sesame seeds, often combined with honey as a sweetener. The cake is round and is brown in color with sesame seeds sprinkled evenly on the surface of the cake. It is quite similar to the Huangqiao sesame cake (simplified Chinese: 黄桥烧饼).

See also
 List of sesame seed dishes

Cakes
Seed cake